Lethogoleos andersoni, or the forgetful snake-eel, is a species of eel in the family Ophichthidae. It is the only member of its genus. It is found only in the Atlantic Ocean off the coast of South Carolina.

References

Ophichthidae
Fish described in 1982